Thinking About Myself is a studio album by German techno/trance artist Cosmic Baby which was released in 1994. It is Cosmic Baby's second studio album.

Reception
John Bush of Allmusic stated "Cosmic Baby's second album is one of the high points of a uniquely Teutonic wish to apply Wagnerian concepts of orchestration and grandeur to techno and trance, in a similar fashion to Sven Väth's Accident in Paradise. While Väth is best at constructing beats and rhythms (to the detriment of his bloated quasi-orchestrations), Cosmic Baby proves more than equal to the symphonic task at hand, while his percussion skills rarely arouse any excitement at all. Despite several obvious high points ("Loops of Infinity," "Au Dessous des Nuages," "Cosmic Greets Florida"), the album attempts much but accomplishes little."

Track listing

Personnel
Band
Cosmic Baby – composer, primary artist, producer
Lisa – vocals
Jens Mahlstedt – guitar
Jens Wojnar – guitar, producer

Production
F.J. Hjordis – design, illustrations
Eike Konig – art direction, design
Wolfgang Ragwitz – mastering

References

External links 
 Thinking About Myself in unofficial discography
 

1994 albums
Cosmic Baby albums